Pararcus is an extinct genus of placodont marine reptile from the Middle Triassic of the Netherlands. The genus is monotypic and the type species is Pararcus diepenbroeki.

References 

Placodonts
Ladinian genera
Middle Triassic reptiles of Europe
Fossils of the Netherlands
Fossil taxa described in 2013
Sauropterygian genera